Harry Thompson was an Australian professional rugby league footballer who played in the 1930s who played Eastern Suburbs and South Sydney as a winger.

Playing career
Thompson made his first grade debut for Eastern Suburbs in 1933 as the club reached the preliminary final that year before being defeated by St George.  The following year, Thompson was a member of the Easts side which reached the grand final but lost to Western Suburbs 15-12.  In 1935, Thompson switched clubs and joined arch rivals South Sydney.  In his first year at the club, Thompson played for Souths in the grand final against Eastern Suburbs and was on the losing side yet again.  In 1939, Thompson was a member of the Souths side which reached the grand final against Balmain but suffered a heavy 33-4 loss at the Sydney Cricket Ground.  This would be the last time Thompson played a first grade match.  Thompson had a unique playing career in which he was the only player to have played in finals games for and against both Souths and Eastern Suburbs until Luke Keary matched this record in 2018.

References

Year of birth missing
Year of death missing
South Sydney Rabbitohs players
City New South Wales rugby league team players
Sydney Roosters players
Rugby league wingers
Rugby league players from Sydney